Victor Emanuel Bendix (17 May 1851 in Copenhagen – January 1926) was a Danish composer, conductor and pianist, who came from a Jewish family.  His teachers included Niels Gade.

He was also a friend of Carl Nielsen, who dedicated his Symphonic Suite for piano (1894) to Bendix.

In 1879, he married the writer and philanthropist Baroness Rigmor Stampe.

Selected works
Symphonies
Symphony no. 1, op. 16, "Fjældstigning" in C major (1882)
Symphony no. 2, op. 20 "Sommerklange fra Sydrusland" in D major (1888)
Symphony no. 3, op. 25 in A minor (1895)
Symphony no. 4, op. 30 in D minor (1904-5) (US premiere? by the Boston Symphony,  April 26, 1907 conducted by Karl Muck)
Concertante works
Piano Concerto in G minor, op. 17 (1884)
Orchestral works
Dance suite in A, op. 29 (1903) (given a performance conducted by Bendix in 1921)
Chamber music
Piano Trio in A major, op. 12 (1877)
Piano Sonata in G minor, op. 26 (published 1901)
Intermezzo for piano (published 1916)

Notes

References
Smith, Frederick Key (2002). . Greenwood Publishing Group. .
Rłllum-Larsen, Claus; Kongelige Bibliotek (Denmark) (2002). . Museum Tusculanum Press. .

External links
 

1851 births
1926 deaths
19th-century classical composers
20th-century classical composers
Danish classical pianists
Danish classical composers
Danish male classical composers
Jewish Danish musicians
Jewish classical composers
Musicians from Copenhagen
Danish Romantic composers
19th-century classical pianists
19th-century Danish composers
Male classical pianists
20th-century Danish male musicians
19th-century male musicians
19th-century musicians